Dolapex is a genus of air-breathing land snails or semislugs, terrestrial pulmonate gastropod mollusks in the family Helicarionidae.

Species
Species within the genus Dolapex include:
 Dolapex amiculus

References

 
Helicarionidae
Taxonomy articles created by Polbot